On Time is an album by pianist Les McCann recorded in 1962 and released on the Pacific Jazz label. It was McCann's first album to feature guitarist Joe Pass.

Reception

Allmusic gives the album 4½ stars.

Track listing 
All compositions by Les McCann except as indicated
 "On Time" - 4:14
 "Yours Is My Heart Alone" (Franz Lehár, Fritz Löhner-Beda) - 4:45
 "This for Doug" (Ron Jefferson) - 5:35
 "Fondue" - 5:12
 "Bernie's Tune" (Bernie Miller) - 3:02
 "Maichen" (Leroy Vinnegar) - 4:34
 "It Could Happen To You" (Jimmy Van Heusen, Johnny Burke) - 5:00
 "You're Driving Me Crazy" (Walter Donaldson) - 4:58
 "So What" (Miles Davis) - 3:00

Personnel 
Les McCann - piano
Joe Pass - guitar
Leroy Vinnegar - bass
Ron Jefferson - drums

References 

Les McCann albums
1962 albums
Pacific Jazz Records albums